Black Ajax is a historical novel by George MacDonald Fraser based on the career of Tom Molineaux.

The father of Harry Flashman appears as a major character although the book is not part of the official Flashman series.

As in those novels, several real life characters are depicted including:
Tom Molineaux
Bill Richmond
Tom Cribb
George IV
Beau Brummel
Pierce Egan
Harriette Wilson
Henry Somerset, 7th Duke of Beaufort

References

Novels by George MacDonald Fraser
1997 British novels
HarperCollins books